Moraxella cuniculi is a Gram-negative bacterium in the genus Moraxella, which was isolated from the oral mucosa of a rabbit in Germany. The previous name was Neisseria cuniculi.

References

External links
Type strain of Moraxella cuniculi at BacDive -  the Bacterial Diversity Metadatabase

Moraxellaceae
Bacteria described in 1984